Sayaf Al-Bishi (born 18 June 1980) is a Saudi Arabian football player who plays as a defender .

Honours

External links
 

Living people
1980 births
Sportspeople from Riyadh
Association football defenders
Saudi Arabian footballers
Al-Shabab FC (Riyadh) players
Ettifaq FC players
Al-Raed FC players
Al-Fateh SC players
Saudi Professional League players